FC Energetik Bishkek is a Kyrgyzstani football club based in Bishkek, Kyrgyzstan that played in the top division in Kyrgyzstan, the Kyrgyzstan League.

History 
19??: Founded as FC Energetik Bishkek.

Achievements 
Kyrgyzstan League:
4th place: 1995 (Promotion/relegation play Off: Northern Zone)

Kyrgyzstan Cup:
1/16 finals: 1996, 1998

Current squad

External links 
Profile at footballfacts.ru

Football clubs in Kyrgyzstan
Football clubs in Bishkek